Khalifehi (also Romanized as Khalīfeh'ī; also known as Khalīfeh) is a village in Rak Rural District, in the Central District of Kohgiluyeh County, Kohgiluyeh and Boyer-Ahmad Province, Iran. At the 2006 census, its population was 324, in 77 families.

References 

Populated places in Kohgiluyeh County